Đokić (also transliterated Djokić) is a Serbian surname, derived from the male given name "Đoka"/"Đoko", itself a diminutive of Đorđe (George). It is predominantly found in Serbia, Montenegro and Bosnia and Herzegovina. Its form in romanized Macedonian is Ǵokić or Gjokić. It may refer to:

 Aleksandar Đokić (born 1936), Serbian architect
 Ana Đokić, former Montenegrin handball player
 Boško Đokić, Serbian professional basketball coach and journalist
 Branimir Đokić, Serbian folk accordionist
 Denise Djokic, Canadian cellist
 Dušan Đokić, Serbian footballer
 Dušanka Đokić (born 1938), Serbian physicist
 Georgije Đokić, retired Serbian Orthodox bishop
 Igor Đokić (born 1979), Serbian football midfielder 
 Jadranka Đokić, Croatian actress
 Jasmina Đokić, Serbian painter 
 Jovan Đokić, Serbian football midfielder
 Lazar Đokić, Montenegrin football attacker
 Ljubisav Đokić (1943-2020), bulldozer operator who became a symbol of the overthrow of Slobodan Milošević
 Milan Đokić (politician) (born 1972), Serbian politician
 Miroslav Ǵokić (born 1973), former Macedonian international footballer
 Nikola Đokić (born 1992), Serbian football goalkeeper
 Momčilo Đokić, Serbian football player and manager
 Oliver Đokić (born 1981), Serbian football midfielder
 Philippe Djokic, Canadian violinist, conductor and music educator
 Rade Đokić, Bosnian Serb footballer
 Ratko Đokić, Yugoslav mob boss in Sweden
 Vladimir Đokić, Serbian professional basketball coach and former player
 Željko Đokić, Serbian-born Bosnian-Herzegovinian footballer
 Zvonimir Đokić (born 1960), Serbian politician

 Đokić brotherhood of the Vasojevići tribe.
 Šop-Đokić (Serbian Cyrillic: Шоп-Ђокић), a Serbian family from Leskovac

See also
 Đokići, a town in Serbia
 Đoković, a surname
 Đokanović, a surname
 Dokić, a surname
 Jokić, a surname

Serbian surnames